The 5th Aviation Division (People's Republic of China) (中国人民解放军空军航空兵第五师, Unit 94590) is the first attack aircraft division of the People's Liberation Army Air Force, and a unit of the Central Military Commission's strategic reserve, founded on December 5, 1950.

Established on December 5, 1950 at Kaiyuan, Liaoning Province, it was part of the Jinan Military Region Air Force. The division was based in Weifang, Shandong. It consists of the 13th Air Regiment (located in Weifang); 14 Air Regiment (based in Ming, composed of Xi'an JH-7 and the Nanchang Q-5, at Xinyang Minggang Airport); and the 15th Air Regiment (in Weifang). The division has participated in the National Day military parade, the Sino-Vietnamese War, the round to Yunnan, hydrogen bomb tests, and the test flight on the Tibetan plateau.

History
In accordance with the Central Military Commission's approval (telegraphed on November 19, 1950), the PLA Air Force commanded the establishment of the 5th Aviation Division on November 25, 1950. The 5th Aviation Division would consist of the 13th and 15th Air Regiments, formerly the 13th Air Regiment and the 15th Supply Squadron, which had both been under the 617th Group of the 206th Independent Infantry Division. The 13th Air Regiment had been formed on August 1, 1950 as part of the 617th Group of the 206th Independent Infantry Division when it received 35 top students from the 1st and 3rd aviation academies. Its equipment started with Ilyushin Il-10 planes left in Xuzhou after the withdrawal of the Soviet Volunteer Group. It became the PLA Air Force's first unit of attack aircraft, and on November 25, 1950 it moved from Xuzhou to Kaiyuan. The first division commander was Ma Yong, and the first political commissar was Ma Zeying.

The 5th Attack Division was still listed by the IISS Military Balance in 2014 with two regiments, one of Q-5E and one of JH-7A.

Around May 2017 the 15th Air Regiment (serials 11x6x) was reorganised as the 15th Aviation Brigade.

References 

Aviation Divisions of the People's Liberation Army
Military units and formations established in 1950
Military units and formations disestablished in the 2010s
1950 establishments in China
2010s disestablishments in China